Grand Central was a chain of discount department stores based in Salt Lake City, Utah. At its peak, the chain operated more than 30 stores in Arizona, Idaho, Nevada, New Mexico, Utah, Wyoming. It was acquired by Portland, Oregon-based retailer Fred Meyer in 1984, which rebranded most locations to Fred Meyer.

History
Grand Central was founded by Russian immigrant Maurice Warshaw (1898 – January 5, 1979), who opened at produce stand on the corner of 900 South and Main Street in Salt Lake City, Utah in 1928. After finding success selling Kellogg's Corn Flakes, Warshaw expanded his business beyond produce by adding his own meat and grocery departments. In 1946, Warshaw partnered with his son, Keith, and son-in-law, Don Mackey, to expand the retailer to multiple locations. Maurice Warshaw left the company in the 1950s to focus on humanitarian work and left management duties to his son and Mackey. The chain then expanded to sell clothing, electric gadgets, hardware, kitchenware, medicine, and toys. 

In 1960, Grand Central sold its food operations to Los Angeles, California-based Mayfair Markets. The chain entered Idaho through the acquisition of Bosko Super Stores from Boise-based grocery retailer Albertsons in June 1963. In 1971, the company went public.

In March 1984, Portland, Oregon-based retailer Fred Meyer announced the purchase of Grand Central for US$11 per share, a transactional value of nearly US$25 million. At the time, Grand Central operated 31 stores and employed about 2,900 people in Idaho, Nevada, New Mexico, Utah, and Wyoming. 21 stores in Idaho and Utah were rebranded Fred Meyer, while stores in Nevada and Wyoming were closed. Seven stores in New Mexico were later acquired by Walmart in January 1985.

References

Companies based in Salt Lake City
Defunct companies based in Utah
Defunct discount stores of the United States
Retail companies established in 1928
Retail companies disestablished in 1984